PS GAS Sawahlunto  stands for Persatuan Sepakbola Gunung Arang Sawahlunto (en: Football Association of Mount Charcoal Sawahlunto) is an Indonesian football club based in Sawahlunto, West Sumatra. They currently compete in the Liga 3 and play at Ombilin Stadium.

The team succeeded in promotion of Liga Indonesia Third Division 2011-2012 to the Liga Indonesia Second Division 2012-2013 but withdrew because of lack of funds to wade through the new season. Now, this club playing in Liga 3.

Honours 
 Liga Nusantara
Champion (1) West Sumatera: 2016
Runner up (2) West Sumatera; National Play Off: 2014

Management

References

External links
  Liga-Indonesia.co.id
  Divisi III LI 2010
 

Football clubs in Indonesia
Football clubs in West Sumatra
Association football clubs established in 1952
1952 establishments in Indonesia